Taiwan Police College (TPC) is a police academy located in Wenshan District, Taipei, Taiwan. The academy is in charge for the education of basic police officers of Taiwan. The institution functions at the level of a junior college, and is responsible for training low-level police officers.

History
The institute was originally established in 1898, during Japanese colonial rule in Taiwan, as a training institute for police and prison officers.

After Taiwan was returned to the Republic of China, it became the Taiwan Provincial Police Training Facilities on 27 October 1945. On 1 April 1948, it was changed to Taiwan Provincial Police Academy. Following the amending and implementation of the Police Education Statute on 9 June 1982, the Taiwan Provincial Police Academy added a junior police college, which enrolled its first students. On 1 July 1986, it changed name again to Taiwan Police Academy and was placed under the National Police Agency of the Ministry of the Interior. On 16 April 1988, the Organizational Statute of Taiwan Police College was passed during the 81st session of the Legislative Yuan and law was enacted by the order of the President on 29 April 1988. The academy was finally renamed Taiwan Police College on 15 June 1988.

In December 1947, the Taiwan Provincial Police Training Facilities enrolled its first female police cadets in December; 61 women enrolled that year, and 36 the following year. In 1951, the Female Police Division (女子警察隊) was established in Taipei, with the tasks of disaster relief, local security, and working with women. From 1951 to 1955, the academy stopped accepting women because of a lack of tasks that they were deemed capable of performing. Recruitment then stopped again and did not resume until 1969, when Taipei became a special municipality. In 1956, female officers' duties were listed: protecting women and children, household registration, the welfare of adopted daughters and sex workers, general security, conducting traffic, and investigating cases related to women and children. However, female officers' roles expanded slowly: according to a report by Central Daily News (中央日報), Taipei's female police force only increased by 10 members from 1956 to 1968. It would not be until the early aughts that all counties and municipalities had female divisions.

As of 2020, the institution also planned to rename its Zhongzheng halls, remove two statues of Chiang Kai-shek. TPC used to have a hall named the "Chiang Kai-shek Hall", but it had renamed it by May 2021.

Organizational structure

 President
 Vice-president
 Chief Secretary

Administrative Units
 Academic Affairs Office
 Disciplinary Office
 General Services
 Secretary's Office
 Forensics Laboratory
 Library
 Clinic
 Personnel Office
 Accounting Office
 Information Management Office
 Student Corps

Departments
 Department of Police Administration
 Department of Criminal Investigation
 Department of Traffic Management
 Department of Fire Safety
 Department of Maritime Patrol
 Department of Technology Crime Investigation
 Center for General Education

Academics 

Judo, taekwondo, wrestling, and firearms training are significant parts of the institution's educational programs. Students must also foster "strong ethical values and mental resilience".

Graduates of the institution must pass the annual police civil service examination, organized annually by the Ministry of Examination (MOEX), before they are allowed to work in government agencies. In 1997, the MOEX opened this examination to applications who have neither graduated from this institution nor the Central Police University to diversify police officers' academic backgrounds; however, recruitment of graduates for both institutions has since decreased. (In 2011, a two-track tiered system was introduced: separate exams are given to those who graduated from TPC or CPU and those who have not, and the number of jobs offered is roughly equal in both groups. TPC and CPU graduates usually pass their own exam's version, but the recruitment rate for the other group is much lower.) TPC offers free tuition for students if they pass this exam within three years of graduation and then serve for at least four years. Furthermore, male graduates are exempt from compulsory military service if they pass this test, but must serve in the military if they do not.

In 2014, TPC opened a facility to teach the liberal arts and humanities.

Academic statistics 
TPC's admission rate is usually less than 15%. In 2013, the academy recruited about 2000 students for its two-year training program, of which more than 60% had already been accepted by or had previously studied at other colleges and universities.

Notable people 

 Lee Cheng-han (李承翰), a then-24-year-old graduate recognized for his extraordinary performance, was stabbed with a fruit knife at Chiayi railway station by Cheng (鄭), then 54, in July 2019. Lee was transferred to Chiayi Christian Hospital, where he was pronounced dead at 8:10am on 4 July 2019. The incident occurred after Cheng, who installed and repaired air conditioners, was found on a northbound Ziqiang Express (自強號) train to have boarded the train without a ticket and refused to pay his full fare, and so Lee was sent to help resolve the dispute.
 Jeng Hsing Ping, the institution's assistant head instructor for 25 years, was sworn by his teacher Chang Dong Sheng to never share techniques other than the basics with his students. However, when Chang Dong Sheng died in 1986, Jeng Hsing Ping started training his students in the depths of the art.

Transportation
The university is accessible South East from Wanfang Hospital Station of Taipei Metro.

See also
 List of universities in Taiwan
 National Police Agency (Republic of China)
 Central Police University

References

External links
 

1945 establishments in Taiwan
Educational institutions established in 1945
Taiwan
Universities and colleges in Taipei